Jeremy Bernstein (born December 31, 1929, in Rochester, New York) is an American theoretical physicist and popular science writer.

Early life
Bernstein's parents, Philip S. Bernstein, a Reform rabbi, and Sophie Rubin Bernstein named him after the biblical Jeremiah, the subject of his father's masters thesis.  Philip's parents were immigrants from Lithuania, while Sophie was of Russian-Jewish descent.  The family moved from Rochester to New York City during World War II, when his father became head of all the Jewish chaplains in the armed forces.

Education and career
Bernstein studied at Harvard University, receiving his bachelor's degree in 1951, masters in 1953, and Ph.D. in 1955, on electromagnetic properties of deuterium, under Julian Schwinger.  As a theoretical physicist, he worked on elementary particle physics and cosmology.  A summer spent in Los Alamos led to a position at the Institute for Advanced Study. In 1962 he became a faculty member at New York University, moving to become a professor of physics at Stevens Institute of Technology in 1967, a position that he continues to hold as professor emeritus.  He has held adjunct or visiting positions at the Brookhaven National Laboratory, CERN, Oxford, the University of Islamabad, and the Ecole Polytechnique.

Bernstein was involved in Project Orion, investigating the potential for nuclear pulse propulsion for use in space travel.

Popular writing
Bernstein is a popular science writer and profiler of scientists.  He was a staff writer for The New Yorker from 1961 to 1995, authoring scores of articles. He has also written regularly for The Atlantic Monthly, the New York Review of Books, and Scientific American, among others.  His books include "Physicists on Wall Street and Other Essays on Science and Society" (2010), "Nuclear Weapons: What You Need to Know" (2010), "Quantum Leaps" (2009), "Hitler's Uranium Club: The Secret Recordings at Farm Hall" (2000), "In the Himalayas: Journeys through Nepal, Tibet, and Bhutan" (1996), and others, more than two dozen books in all.  "The Life It Brings", an autobiographical memoir, was published in 1986.  Bernstein's biographical profiles of physicists, including Robert Oppenheimer, Hans Bethe, Albert Einstein, John Stewart Bell and others, are able to draw on the experiences of personal acquaintance. Bernstein's latest publication is "A Bouquet of Dyson: and Other Reflections on Science and Scientists" (2018),

Books
Analytical Engine – Computers Past, Present and Future, Random House, 1964
A Comprehensible World: On Modern Science and its Origin, Random House, 1967
Elementary Particles and Their Currents, Freeman, 1968
Einstein, Viking Press 1973, Penguin Books, 1976
Experiencing Science, Basic Books, 1978
Hans Bethe – Prophet of Energy, Basic Books, 1980
Science Observed – Essays Out of My Mind, Basic Books, 1982
Three Degrees Above Zero – Bell Labs in the Information Age, Scribners, 1984
Cosmological Constants – Papers in Modern Cosmology (with Gerald Feinberg), Columbia University Press, 1986 
The Life it Brings – One Physicist's Beginnings, Ticknor and Field, Penguin, 1987 
Kinetic Theory in the Expanding Universe, Cambridge University Press, 1988
Tenth Dimension: an Informal History of High Energy Physics, McGraw Hill, 1989
Quantum Profiles conversations with physicists John Stewart Bell and John Archibald Wheeler, (and  Einstein's correspondence with Michele Besso), Princeton University Press, 1991 ; second edition: 2020 
Cranks, Quarks and the Cosmos – Writings on Science, Basic Books, 1993 
A Theory of Everything (Essays), Springer, 1996 
Albert Einstein and the Frontiers of Physics, Oxford University Press, 1996
Hitler's Uranium Club – The Secret Recordings of Farm Hall (with David C. Cassidy), American Institute of Physics, 1996
Modern Physics (with Paul Fishbane, Stephen Gasiorowicz), Prentice Hall, 2000
The Merely Personal: Observations on Science and Scientists, Ivan Dee, 2001
Oppenheimer – Portrait of an Enigma, Ivan Dee, 2004 
Secrets of the Old One: Albert Einstein 1905, Copernicus Books, 2006
Plutonium – a History of the World's Most Dangerous Element, Joseph Henry Press, 2007 
A Physicist on Wall Street and Other Essays on Science and Society, Springer, 2008 
Quantum Leaps, Belknap Press, 2009; 2011 pbk edition 
A Palette of Particles, Harvard University Press, 2013 
Nuclear Weapons – What You Need to Know, Cambridge University Press, 2010 
A Chorus of Bells and Other Scientific Inquiries, World Scientific, 2014 
A Bouquet of Numbers and Other Scientific Offerings, World Scientific, 2016 
A Bouquet of Dyson and Other Reflections on Science and Scientists, World Scientific, 2018

Media appearances
 To Mars by A-Bomb: The Secret History of Project Orion (BBC, 2003)

References

External links

Scientific publications of Jeremy Bernstein on INSPIRE-HEP

1929 births
American people of Russian-Jewish descent
American people of Lithuanian-Jewish descent
21st-century American physicists
People associated with CERN
Harvard University alumni
Jewish American scientists
Jewish physicists
Living people
New York University faculty
Writers from Rochester, New York
Scientific American people
Stevens Institute of Technology faculty
The Atlantic (magazine) people
The New Yorker people
Scientists from Rochester, New York
Fellows of the American Physical Society
21st-century American Jews